Plaesiostola is a genus of moths belonging to the family Tineidae. It contains only one species, Plaesiostola diaplintha, which is found on Borneo.

References

Tineidae
Monotypic moth genera
Moths of Asia
Tineidae genera
Taxa named by Edward Meyrick